Houston County is a county located in the U.S. state of Texas. As of the 2020 census, its population was 22,066. Its county seat is Crockett. Houston County was one of 46 entirely dry counties in the state of Texas, until voters in a November 2007 special election legalized the sale of alcohol in the county.

Houston County was the first new county created under the 9-year Republic of Texas on June 12, 1837. The original boundaries of Houston County also included all of present-day Anderson and Trinity Counties, and portions of present-day Henderson and Polk Counties.

The county is named for Sam Houston,  President of the Republic of Texas and Governor of Texas.

A county historical museum is located in a former railroad depot, located on First Street in Crockett.

History

Samuel Cartmill Hiroms (1836–1920) was born in present-day Polk County, his parents having been among Stephen F. Austin's "Old 300" families. Hiroms was an educator and a surveyor, who served in the Confederate Army. His second wife Emily Ann (née Johnston, 1853–1948) and he settled in the Creek community of Houston County. Their homestead was adjacent to what is now the Austonio Baptist Church on State Highway 21 in Austonio, Texas.

Collin Aldrich (1801–1842) was a veteran of the Battle of San Jacinto, and was the first judge in Houston County, having served during the Republic of Texas from 1837 to 1841.

Eli Coltharp established his Coltharp Hill in Houston County near Kennard. The store, post office, gristmill, cotton gin, blacksmith shop, and millinery shop were located on the stagecoach route west of Nacogcoches in Houston County. When the railroad bypassed the Contharp community, many of the residents relocated to work at a nearby sawmill.

James Murphy Hager of Kentucky and his wife Nacoma (née Clark) established the Hagerville community in the 1840s. Hager was a farmer, cabinet maker, and blacksmith. The stagecoach from Nacogdoches to Navasota ran beside the Hagers' log home. One of the Hager sons donated land for a church and a school. A post office was at Hagerville from 1891 to 1905.

The Four C Mill operated in Houston County during the first two decades of the 20th century. R. M. Keith, agent of the Central Coal and Coke Company in Kansas City, Missouri, began buying virgin timber in the fall of 1899. Lumber to construct the new mill was cut by a small sawmill purchased in early 1901 from J. H. Ratcliff. Keith organized the Louisiana and Texas Lumber Company to operate the Four C. The mill was producing 300,000 board feet of lumber daily by June 1902. Ratcliff Lake, now a United States Department of Interior recreational site, was the millpond for the Four C. The Texas Southeastern Railroad laid track from Lufkin to haul out the lumber. The town of Ratcliff was separated from the Four C by a fence, built to discourage the mill workers from spending their money outside the company town. The 120,000 acres were in time exhausted, and by 1920, the mill shut down.

Geography

Adjacent counties
 Anderson County (north)
 Cherokee County (northeast)
 Angelina County (east)
 Trinity County (southeast)
 Walker County (south)
 Madison County (southwest)
 Leon County (west)

National protected area
 Davy Crockett National Forest (part)

Demographics

Note: the US Census treats Hispanic/Latino as an ethnic category. This table excludes Latinos from the racial categories and assigns them to a separate category. Hispanics/Latinos can be of any race.

As of the census of 2000, 23,185 people, 8,259 households, and 5,756 families were residing in the county.  The population density was 19 people per mi2 (7/km2); it had the second-lowest population density for all counties in Deep East Texas, behind only Newton County.  The  10,730 housing units averaged 9 per mi2 (3/km2).  The racial makeup of the county was 68.57% White, 27.93% African American, 0.26% Native American, 0.25% Asian,  2.23% from other races, and 0.76% from two or more races.  About 7.50% of the population were Hispanics or Latinos of any race.

Of the 8,259 households, 28.70% had children under the age of 18 living with them, 51.90% were married couples living together, 14.20% had a female householder with no husband present, and 30.30% were notfamilies. About 27.90% of all households were made up of individuals, and 15.10% had someone living alone who was 65 years of age or older.  The average household size was 2.44, and the average family size was 2.97.

In the county, the age distribution was 23.20% under 18, 6.80% from 18 to 24, 27.70% from 25 to 44, 24.30% from 45 to 64, and 18.00% who were 65 or older.  The median age was 40 years. For every 100 females, there were 114.10 males.  For every 100 females age 18 and over, there were 115.90 males.

The median income for a household in the county was $28,119, and for a family was $35,033. Males had a median income of $29,143 versus $19,885 for females. The per capita income for the county was $14,525.  About 15.60% of families and 21.00% of the population were below the poverty line, including 28.30% of those under age 18 and 18.20% of those age 65 or over.

Government and infrastructure

Eastham Unit, a Texas Department of Criminal Justice prison for men, is located in an unincorporated area in the county.

The Crockett State School, a Texas Youth Commission juvenile correctional facility for boys, was located in Crockett. but was closed on August 31, 2011.

Chuck Hopson, a pharmacist from Jacksonville, is a Republican and the member of the Texas House of Representatives, whose District 11 includes Houston County.

Transportation

Major highways
  U.S. Highway 287
  State Highway 7
  State Highway 19
  State Highway 21

Houston County is served by US Highway 287 and State Highways 7, 19, and 21.  All of these highways intersect at the Courthouse Square in downtown Crockett.  SH 21 follows the 300-year-old route of  Old San Antonio Road.  Texas State Highway Loop 304 circles the city of Crockett.

Rail
Freight rail service is provided by Union Pacific Railroad.  The Crockett Depot, built in 1909, has been restored and now serves as the Houston County Museum.

Air
Houston County Airport (KDKR), located 3 miles east of Crockett on SH 7, features a 4,000-foot runway.  On-site aircraft services are provided by East Texas Aircraft.

Public transportation
Demand and response public transportation within Houston County is provided by Brazos Transit District.

Communities

Cities
 Crockett (county seat)
 Grapeland
 Kennard
 Latexo
 Lovelady

Unincorporated communities

 Allen Chapel
 Arbor Grove
 Ash
 Augusta
 Austonio
 Belott
 Center Grove
 Center Hill
 Cooper
 Creek
 Cut
 Germany
 Holly
 Hopewell
 Mapleton
 Mound City (partly in Anderson County)
 Mount Vernon
 Pennington (partly in Trinity County)
 Porter Springs
 Ratcliff
 Refuge
 San Pedro
 Sand Ridge
 Shady Grove
 Smith Grove
 Volga
 Weches
 Weldon

Ghost towns

 Antioch
 Coltharp
 Elkins
 Pearson's Chapel
 Pleasant Hill
 Prairie Point
 Shiloh

Education 
Five school districts are located entirely in the county:
 Crockett Independent School District
 Lovelady Independent School District
 Kennard Independent School District
 Latexo Independent School District
 Grapeland Independent School District

In addition, small portions of Groveton Independent School District and Elkhart Independent School District, located in Trinity County and Anderson County, respectively, extend into Houston County.

The county is in the district for Angelina College.

See also

 Museums in East Texas
 National Register of Historic Places listings in Houston County, Texas
 Recorded Texas Historic Landmarks in Houston County
 Wet counties

References

External links

 Houston County government's website
 
 Crockett Community Website
 Crockett Area Chamber of Commerce Preview
 Houston County and Crockett Area Chamber of Commerce
 Bromberg, Dr. Leon, Biographies
Bromberg_Mendel.htm in Aldrich, Armistead Albert, History of Houston County, Texas, Together with Biographical Sketches of Many Pioneers and Later Citizens of Said County, Who Have Made Notable Contributions to its Development and Progress, San Antonio:  The Naylor Company, 1943.

 
1837 establishments in the Republic of Texas
Populated places established in 1837
Sam Houston